Clara Hätzlerin (c. 1430 – 1476) was a professional scribe in 15th century Augsburg. Her 1471 Liederbuch (songbook), a varied collection of love poems and an important literary manuscript, was among the sources used by composer Carl Orff for his tragic Die Bernauerin (1947).

Clara-Hätzler-Straße in Augsburg is named after her.

Hätzlerin is one of the 999 notable women whose names are displayed on the Heritage Floor of Judy Chicago's The Dinner Party art installation (1979).

See also
 The Dinner Party
 List of women calligraphers
 List of women in the Heritage Floor

References

Further reading
Burghart Wachinger, Liebe und Literatur im spätmittelalterlichen Schwaben und Franken, Zur Augsburger Sammelhandschrift der Clara Hätzlerin, DVjs 56 (1982), 386–406.
Edmunds, Sheila. 'The Life and Work of Clara Hätzlerin' in Journal of the Early Book Society for the study of manuscripts and printing history (New York: Pace University Press): 2 (1999).
Glaser, Elvira, 'Das Graphemsystem der Clara Hätzlerin im Kontext der Handschrift Heidelberg, Cpg. 677', in: Deutsche Sprache in Raum und Zeit, Festschrift für Peter Wiesinger zum 60. Geburtstag, eds. Ernst and Patocka, Vienna (1998), p. 479–494.
Liederbuch der Clara Hätzlerin : aus der Handschrift des Böhmischen Museums zu Prag, ed.  C. Haltaus. - Quedlinburg : Basse, 1840; reprint: . (Full text available in both English and German from the Internet Archive)

1430s births
1476 deaths
German women writers
Writers from Augsburg
Medieval European scribes
Women calligraphers
15th-century German women writers
15th-century German writers
15th-century calligraphers
15th-century musicians
15th-century women musicians